Jaqueline de Paula (born 17 February 1986) is a Brazilian basketball player for Pinheiros Santo André and the Brazilian national team, where she participated at the 2014 FIBA World Championship.

She was also a member of the Brazil women's national basketball team which competed at the 2015 Pan American Games.

References

1986 births
Living people
Brazilian women's basketball players
Point guards
Basketball players at the 2015 Pan American Games
Pan American Games competitors for Brazil
Shooting guards